Nikah (Eng Marriage) is a Pakistani  television series aired from 2014 to 2015 on Hum TV. It is presented by Momina Duraid, written by Nasir Hussain and stars Sonya Hussain and Junaid Khan in leads.

Synopsis 
The story of Drama serial, Nikaah, revolves around Ayesha and Rohail, who are engaged to each other. Being first cousins, they spend their childhood in the same house and are quite close. Rohail has always dreamt of going abroad for higher studies and his dreams come true after he completes his schooling. With priorities and tastes changing with time, Rohail finds himself attracted to Zara and marries her without letting his family know, fearing that they would not approve of it.

Cast 
 Junaid Khan as Rohail
 Sonya Hussain as Ayesha (Rohail's First Wife)
 Sanam Chaudhry as Zara (Rohail's Second Wife)
 Tipu Sharif as Nadeem 
 Shehryar Zaidi As Rohail's Dad
 Saba Faisal as Nadeem's mother
 Seemi Pasha as Rohail's Mom
 Kiran Tabeir as Zubi
 Rahma Khan as Young Ayesha

See also 
 List of programs broadcast by Hum TV

References

External links 
 Hum TV Website

Pakistani drama television series
Hum TV original programming
Urdu-language television shows
2015 Pakistani television series debuts